Zion Nelson is an American football offensive tackle who currently plays for the Miami Hurricanes.

Early life and high school
Nelson grew up in Sumter, South Carolina and attended Sumter High School. He was initially rated a two-star recruit and committed to play college football at Appalachian State. Nelson's recruitment picked up during his senior season, in which the Fighting Gamecocks rushed for over 2,000 yards and won 10 games, and he flipped his commitment after a late offer from Miami.

College career
Nelson enrolled joined the Miami Hurricanes as an early enrollee. He was named the starting left tackle for the Hurricanes going into his freshman year after performing well in summer training camp. Nelson started all 13 of Miami's games as a freshman and allowed the most sacks of any starting tackle from a Power Five conference. After initially losing his starting job, Nelson regained his spot as the Hurricanes' starting left tackle for the final six games of his sophomore season.

References

External links 
 Miami Hurricanes bio

Living people
American football offensive tackles
Miami Hurricanes football players
Players of American football from South Carolina
2001 births